WVEP is a public radio formatted broadcast radio station licensed to Martinsburg, West Virginia, serving the Eastern Panhandle and the Potomac Highlands in West Virginia and the Northern Shenandoah Valley in Virginia.  WVEP is owned and operated by West Virginia Public Broadcasting, through licensee West Virginia Educational Broadcasting Authority.  The station's main transmitter is located atop Pinnacle Mountain in the Great North Mountain range, between Capon Springs, West Virginia and Mountain Falls Park, Virginia.

Booster station
In addition to the main station, WVEP is relayed by a co-channel FM booster station to widen its broadcast area.  The booster is also owned and operated by West Virginia Public Broadcasting, and broadcasts from a site south of Bardane, West Virginia.

References

External links
West Virginia Public Broadcasting Online

NPR member stations
VEP
Martinsburg, West Virginia